Children's Railway may refer to:
In general
Children's railway - educational railways run by children
Train ride - small trains suited for children
Specific railways
 Children's Railway (Efteling)
Children's Railway (Budapest)
Children's Railway Sakhalin